Frank McDonald may refer to:

 Frank McDonald (journalist) (born 1950), environment editor of The Irish Times
 Frank McDonald (director) (1899–1980), American film director
 Frank McDonald (footballer) (1899–1962), Australian footballer
 Frank B. McDonald (1925–2012), astrophysicist and creator of the Voyager probe
 Frank McDonald (American football), American football player
 Frank McDonald, Sr (1912–1997), mayor of Evansville, Indiana, 1960–1972
 Frank McDonald, II (born 1951), mayor of Evansville, Indiana, 1987–2000

See also
Francis McDonald (disambiguation)
Franklin M. McDonald (1850–?), soldier
 Frank MacDonald (1896–2003), final surviving Tasmanian veteran of World War I
Frankie MacDonald (born 1984), amateur weather man